A population centre, in Canadian census data, is a populated place, or a cluster of interrelated populated places, which meets the demographic characteristics of an urban area, having a population of at least 1,000 people and a population density of no fewer than 400 persons per square km2.

The term was first introduced in the Canada 2011 Census; prior to that, Statistics Canada used the term urban area.

In the 2021 Census of Population, Statistics Canada listed 108 population centres in the province of British Columbia.

List 
The below table is a list of those population centres in British Columbia from the 2021 Census of Population as designated, named, and delineated by Statistics Canada.

See also
List of the largest population centres in Canada

References

Population centres